Otis Ridge is a ski area located in Otis, Massachusetts in southeastern Berkshire County about 6 miles east of Great Barrington. It first opened in 1946 with two surface lifts and a single trail and continues to operate to this day, currently with one double chair and three surface lifts: a pony tow, a handle tow, and a T-bar. The mountain is presently owned by Ski Butternut, who acquired it in 2016 to save the historic ski area from foreclosure. Otis is known for their historically renowned racing program.

References

Ski areas and resorts in Massachusetts
1946 establishments in Massachusetts